was a town located in Nakakoma District, Yamanashi Prefecture, Japan.

As of 2003, the town had an estimated population of 18,986 and a density of 471.35 persons per km². The total area was 40.28 km².

On September 1, 2004, Shikishima, along with the town of Futaba (from Kitakoma District), and the town of Ryūō (also from Nakakoma District), was merged to create the city of Kai.

External links
Official website of Kai city 

Dissolved municipalities of Yamanashi Prefecture
Kai, Yamanashi